The Shalan Town Flood of 2005 was a severe flood which occurred in Shalan Town in the afternoon on 10 June 2005. A severe flood and mudslide took place in Shalan Town located in Ning'an, which was in Mudanjiang area in Heilongjiang Province, a province in the People's Republic of China. Shalan Town Central Primary School was submerged by floodwater, killing 117 people, 105 of which were students.

References

2005 Shalan
2005 floods in Asia
2005 disasters in China